The 33d Flying Training Wing is an inactive United States Army Air Forces unit.  It was last assigned to the Central Flying Training Command, and was disbanded on 13 October 1946 at Randolph Field, Texas.

There is no lineage link between the United States Air Force 33d Fighter Wing, established on 15 October 1947 at Roswell Army Airfield, New Mexico, and this organization.

History
The wing was a World War II Command and Control organization which supported Training Command Flight Schools in Central and Northern Texas and Oklaholma.   The assigned schools provided phase III advanced two-engine flying training for Air Cadets, along with advanced B-25 Mitchell transition training for experienced pilots for reassignment to other flying units. Air Cadet graduates of the advanced schools were commissioned as Second Lieutenants, received their "wings" and were reassigned to Operational or Replacement Training Units operated by one of the four numbered air fores in the zone of interior.

As training requirements changed during the war, schools were activated and inactivated or transferred to meet those requirements.

Lineage
 Established as 33d Flying Training Wing on 17 December1942
 Activated on 16 January 1943
 Disbanded on 13 October 1946.

Assignments
  AAF Gulf Coast Training Center (later Central Flying Training Command), 16 January 1943 – 13 October 1946

Training aircraft
The schools of the wing used primarily the Beechcraft AT-7 and Cessna AT-17/UC-78 as their two-engine advanced trainer.
 Curtiss-Wright AT-9 high performance two-engine trainers were also used for high-performance fighter training
 Beechcraft AT-10s for two-engine bomber training.
 North American B-25s were used for two-engine transition training
 L-2, L-3, L-4, TG-5 and TG-6s were used for glider and liaison pilot training

Assigned Schools

 Altus Army Airfield, Altus, Oklahoma
 AAF Pilot School (Advanced Two-Engine)
 66th Two-Engine Flying Training Group
 Opened: June 1942, Closed: May 1945 (AT-9, AT-17, UC-78)
 Base closed May 1945; reopened 1953, now Altus Air Force Base

 Blackland Army Airfield, Waco, Texas
 AAF Pilot School (Advanced 2-Engine), also transition school
 73d Two-Engine Flying Training Group
 Opened: September 1942, Closed: October 1945 (AT-9, AT-10, AT-17, UC-78, B-25)
 Conducted Glider Training August–October 1942; B-25 Transition school opened April 1944

 Brooks Field, San Antonio, Texas
 AAF Pilot School (Advanced 2-Engine)
 67th Two-Engine Flying Training Group
 Opened: December 1940, Closed: January 1945 (AT-6, BC-1, O-52)
 World War I training airfield, two-engine school opened December 1940; also flew advanced single-engine trainers; trained observation pilots; later Brooks Air Force Base, closed 2011

 Ellington Field, Houston, Texas
 AAF Pilot School (Advanced 2-Engine)
 68th Two-Engine Flying Training Group
 Opened: January 1942, Closed: November 1945 (AT-9, AT-10, AT-17, UC-78)
 World War I training airfield, re-opened October 1941, later Ellington Air Force Base, closed 1976, now Ellington Air National Guard Base (TX ANG)

 Frederick Army Airfield, Frederick, Oklahoma
 AAF Pilot School (Advanced 2-Engine), also transition school
 70th Two-Engine Flying Training Group
 Opened: March 1943, Closed: November 1945 (AT-9, UC-78, A-26, B-25)
 B-25 Transition school opened January 1945

 Lubbock Army Airfield, Lubbock, Texas
 AAF Pilot School (Advanced 2-Engine)
 71st Two-Engine Flying Training Group
 Opened: February 1942, Closed: January 1945 (AT-6, AT-9, AT-10, AT-17, UC-78)
 Also Glider/Liaison pilot training (L-2, L-5, CG-4A) during 1943; became Advanced, Single-Engine, Jan-Oct 1945; reopened 1949 as Reese Air Force Base, closed 1997

 Pampa Army Airfield, Pampa, Texas
 AAF Pilot School (Advanced 2-Engine), also transition school
 74th Two-Engine Flying Training Group
 Opened: October 1942, Closed: September 1945 (AT-9, AT-10, AT-17, UC-78, B-25)
 B-25 Transition school opened October 1944

Stations
 Blackland Army Airfield, Texas, 16 January 1943
 Waco Army Airfield, Texas, 8 Jul 1944
 Randolph Field, Texas, (temporary 31 October 1945) permanent 5 August – 13 October 1946

See also

 Army Air Forces Training Command
 Other Central Flying Training Command Flight Training Wings:
 31st Flying Training Wing (World War II) Primary Flight Training
 32d Flying Training Wing (World War II) Basic Flight Training
 34th Flying Training Wing (World War II) Bombardier and Specialized Two/Four-Engine Training
 77th Flying Training Wing (World War II) Advanced Flight Training, Single Engine
 78th Flying Training Wing (World War II) Classification/Preflight Unit
 80th Flying Training Wing (World War II) Navigation and Glider

References

Training wings of the United States Army Air Forces
Military units and formations disestablished in 1946
1943 establishments in Texas
1946 disestablishments in Texas